The Windsor Senate District is one of 16 districts of the Vermont Senate. The current district plan is included in the redistricting and reapportionment plan developed by the Vermont General Assembly following the 2020 U.S. Census, which applies to legislatures elected in 2022, 2024, 2026, 2028, and 2030.The Windsor district includes all of Windsor County, along with some parts of others. 

As of the 2010 census, the state as a whole had a population of 625,741. As there are a total of 30 senators, there were 20,858 residents per senator. 

As of the 2000 census, the state as a whole had a population of 608,827. As there are a total of 30 Senators, there were 20,294 residents per senator.  The Windsor District had a population of 57,418 in that same census.  The district is apportioned three senators. This equals 19,139 residents per senator, 5.69% below the state average.

District Senators 
As of 2016:
Alison H. Clarkson, Democrat
Alice Nikita, Democrat
Richard McCormack, Democrat
2005-2006
 John F. Campbell, Democrat
 Matt Dunne, Democrat
 Peter F. Welch, Democrat

2007-2016

 John F. Campbell, Democrat
 Dick McCormack, Democrat
 Alice Nitka, Democrat

As of 2017

 Alison Clarkson, Democrat
 Dick McCormack, Democrat
 Alice Nitka, Democrat

Towns and cities in the Windsor District, 2002–2012 elections

Windsor County 

 Andover
 Baltimore
 Barnard
 Bethel
 Bridgewater
 Cavendish
 Chester
 Hartford
 Hartland
 Ludlow
 Norwich
 Plymouth
 Pomfret
 Reading
 Rochester
 Royalton
 Sharon
 Springfield
 Stockbridge
 Weathersfield
 West Windsor
 Weston
 Windsor
 Woodstock

References

External links 

 Redistricting information from Vermont Legislature
 2002 and 2012 Redistricting information from Vermont Legislature
 Map of Vermont Senate districts and statistics (PDF) 2002–2012

Vermont Senate districts
Windsor County, Vermont